Veronika Bilgeri (born 25 January 1966 in Bad Tölz) is a West German luger who competed during the late 1980s. She won two medals at the 1988 FIL European Luge Championships in Königssee, West Germany with a gold in the mixed team event and a silver in the women's singles event.

Bilgeri also finished fourth in the women's singles event at the 1988 Winter Olympics in Calgary, Alberta, Canada.

References
1988 luge women's singles results
List of European luge champions 
Olympic results in women's singles luge: 1964-2002 

German female lugers
Living people
Lugers at the 1988 Winter Olympics
Olympic lugers of West Germany
1966 births
People from Bad Tölz
Sportspeople from Upper Bavaria